Nicolás Imanol Alberto Solabarrieta Vergara (born Nicolás Alberto Kozak Vergara; 24 August 1996 in Chile) is a Chilean footballer who plays as a forward for Serie D side Seravezza Pozzi.

Career

Solabarrieta played college soccer for the University at Albany after failing to make an appearance for Chilean top flight side Club Deportivo Universidad Católica. While playing for the University at Albany, he also played for the Long Island Rough Riders, Tucson, as well as Reading United AC in the American fourth division.

For 2019, he signed for Uruguayan second division outfit Tacuarembó.

For 2020, Solabarrieta signed for Palestino in the Chilean top flight. On secolnd half 2021, he joined Chilean Segunda División side Deportes Recoleta.

In 2023, he joined ASD Seravezza Pozzi in the Italian Serie D.

Personal life
He is the son of the Chilean sports journalist Fernando Solabarrieta and of the journalist and TV host Ivette Vergara. From his paternal line, he is of Basque descent since his grandfather is Spanish and of Syrian origin on his grandmother's side.

References

External links
 
 Nicolás Solabarrieta at playmakerstats.com (English version of ceroacero.es)

Living people
1996 births
Chilean people of Basque descent
Chilean people of Syrian descent
Footballers from Santiago
Chilean footballers
Chilean expatriate footballers
Association football forwards
Albany Great Danes men's soccer players
Long Island Rough Riders players
FC Tucson players
Tacuarembó F.C. players
Club Deportivo Palestino footballers
Deportes Recoleta footballers
Lautaro de Buin footballers
USL League Two players
Uruguayan Segunda División players
Chilean Primera División players
Segunda División Profesional de Chile players
Serie D players
Expatriate soccer players in the United States
Chilean expatriate sportspeople in the United States
Expatriate footballers in Uruguay
Chilean expatriate sportspeople in Uruguay
Expatriate footballers in Italy
Chilean expatriate sportspeople in Italy